The Night We Dropped a Clanger is a 1959 black and white British comedy film directed by Darcy Conyers and starring Brian Rix, Cecil Parker, William Hartnell and Leslie Phillips.

The title comes from the British expression "to drop a clanger", meaning to say something inappropriate or revealing. It links in the title to the secondary meaning of "clang", the noise of a metallic object hitting the floor. It was released as Make Mine a Double in the United States.

A British secret agent is sent on a secret operation in occupied France during the Second World War but a diversionary tactic turns into a farcical tale of mistaken identity. 

Andrew Sachs made his film debut in a minor role.

Plot
When mysterious, unpiloted, midget aircraft start landing in southern England during the Second World War, secret agent Wing Commander Blenkinsop, VC and bar, is chosen for a top-secret mission to occupied France to investigate. Meanwhile, as a diversionary tactic to deceive the Germans, his exact look-alike, Aircraftsman [sic] Atwood (both parts are played by Rix), is reluctantly recruited to go to North Africa. However, through a farcical mixup, Blenkinsop finds himself in Africa and Atwood ends up in France.

By far more luck than judgement, Atwood returns to England in one of the buzz bombs and, with everyone (including Blenkinsop's girlfriend) believing he is Blenkinsop, he continues the impersonation and becomes a national hero, while the real Blenkinsop desperately tries to regain his identity and his life.

Cast
 Brian Rix – Aircraftman Arthur Atwood/Wing Commander Blenkinsop
 Cecil Parker – Air Vice-Marshal Sir Bertram Bukpasser
 William Hartnell – Warrant Officer Bright
 Leslie Phillips – Squadron Leader Thomas
 Leo Franklyn – Belling
 John Welsh – Squadron Leader Grant
 Toby Perkins – Flight Lieutenant Spendal
 Liz Fraser – Lulu
 Charles Cameron – General Gimble
 Vera Pearce – Madame Grilby
 Julian D'Albie – Air Marshal Carruthers
 Sarah Branch – WAAF Hawkins
 Irene Handl – Mrs. Billingsgate
 Andrew Sachs – Briggs 
 Hattie Jacques – Ada
 Arthur Brough – Admiral Bewdly
 Ray Cooney – Corporal
 Oliver Johnston – Air Commodore Turner
 Merilyn Roberts – 1st WAAF
 Sheila Mercier – 2nd WAAF 
 Christine Russell – 3rd WAAF 
 Larry Noble – Farmer
 John Langham – Ricky
 Rowland Bartrop – Smythe 
 Julie Mendez – Dancer
 Patrick Cargill – Fritz

Critical reception
SKY Movies wrote, "a typically rickety British farce of the late Fifties, a time when the Carry On's were gaining their first foothold. This is a sort of Carry On Flying: Brian Rix has a field day in a dual role and there's even William Hartnell, giving his comic all as yet another barking NCO. Broad, unpolished, lowbrow fun."

References

External links

https://www.youtube.com/watch?v=Y8JWUHNswIU Full movie on YouTube.

1959 films
1959 comedy films
British war comedy films
British World War II films
Films set in Libya
Films set in London
Films set in France
Films shot at British National Studios
1950s English-language films
1950s British films